Ninja Terminator is a 1985 film released in the US by the companies IFD and Filmark, directed, written, and edited by Godfrey Ho. It stars Richard Harrison as Ninja Master Harry MacQueen, Jack Lam as Jaguar Wong, Hwang Jang-lee (accredited as Wong Cheng Li) as Tiger Chan. Godfrey Ho frequently created movies by filming scenes that he then added to pre-existing films, re-cutting it together and dubbing over the actors with his own dialogue in order to create a new story. Similarly, Ninja Terminator reuses over 50% of its footage from a Korean film The Uninvited Guest Of The Star Ferry (1984). IFD owned the international sales rights for the film and decided to insert Caucasian actors into the film in the hopes it would then do better overseas. Ho did this and added ninjas to the storyline, as he usually did for his films. The new footage introduced a storyline about ninjas hunting for pieces of a magical statue.

Plot
A villainous Ninja Empire is celebrating its twentieth anniversary of rulership. The leader, Supreme Ninja, celebrates by having his three greatest warriors - Ninja Masters Tamashi, Baron, and Harry MacQueen - bring him the three pieces of a gold bust known as the Golden Ninja Warrior. When the three pieces - two separated arms, each holding a small sword, and a head/torso - are united, it makes the owner impervious to harm from blades. Believing the Empire is in need of reform and that the Supreme Ninja is too dangerous to possess such power, the three Ninja Masters steal and separate the pieces of the Golden Ninja Warrior.

The Ninja Empire seeks out these rogue ninjas in order to retrieve the missing pieces of the shrine. Two years after the theft of the statue, the warrior Karada kills the rogue ninja Tamashi, retrieving the body of the Golden Ninja Warrior for the Empire and bringing it to his trusted warrior Yamato. Ninja Master Baron, now a crime lord, tells his lieutenant Tiger Chan to see if Tamashi entrusted the statue's body to his brother Ikaza or his sister Michiko. Unable to find it, Tiger's agents kill Ikaza. The glib warrior Jaguar Wong learns of this and informs his employer, Ninja Master Harry. On Harry's advice, Jaguar leaves to protect Michiko from Tiger Chan, defeating several agents. When he attempts to warn her about the danger of the Golden Ninja Warrior, she doesn't know what she's talking about and mistakes his questions for threats. The Supreme Ninja's warrior Yamato dons a red ninja uniform and attacks Harry with one of Baron's throwing stars, then attacks Baron with one of Harry's throwing stars. Harry and Baron suspect that each other has decided to unite the Golden Ninja Warrior and attain its power.

Jaguar Wong reunites with his former lover Lily. After spending the night together, Lilly explains that they cannot see each other again because she is now romantically involved with Tiger's right-hand man Victor Lee. Meanwhile, Ninja Master Harry and Ninja Master Baron, each the other has already tried to assassinate them. After each shows the throwing star used against them, Harry concludes that Yamato is the true culprit, as he had access to throwing stars they used when they all still worked for the Ninja Empire. Harry suggests that the Supreme Ninja's warrior Yamato killed Tamashi and then tried to trick him and Baron into killing each other by planting the stars. He suggests he and Baron work together rather than against each other.

Yamato sends a tiny robot to deliver a threat to Harry, then calls him on the phone to make sure he got it, telling him he has three days to return his piece of the Golden Ninja Warrior. Baron is also threatened by a toy robot from the Empire. Despite Baron and Harry now having an uneasy alliance, Tiger Chan has his righthand man Victor Lee kidnap Michiko in hopes she will lead them to the Golden Dragon Warrior's body. In retaliation, Jaguar kidnaps Lily and offers to make a hostage trade with Victor. During the trade, he realizes the "Michiko" present is an impostor and is told the real woman is tied up to a remote control time bomb. Jaguar is barely able to find and save Michiko in time. Meanwhile, Baron is sent a video tape from Yamato, who again demands the return of all pieces of the Golden Ninja Warrior and that Baron commit suicide to restore his honor. Otherwise, Yamato threatens to kill Ninja Master Baron, saying, "And I am a Ninja Terminator."

Once Michiko is safe, Jaguar Wong fights Tiger Chan and finally defeats him. Baron and Harry bring their pieces of the statue to a meeting place where Yamato arrives with the statue's body. Harry and Baron then take turns attacking Yamato. Baron is killed but Harry then has Yamato at his mercy. Despite Yamato's pleas that this defeat means he cannot return to the Empire and he would rather die an honorable death, Harry ignores him and unites the pieces of the statue. As Harry achieves its power, Yamato seems to blow himself up through force of will.

Reception
In 80s Action Movies on the Cheap, author Daniel R. Budnik wrote that the film "has a straightforward plot that goes off on a dozen loopy tangents".  Jim Vorel of Paste included it in the magazine's list of "The 100 Best Martial Arts Movies of All Time" at #100, calling the film hilarious despite its incoherence and ineptitude.  Total Film similarly included it in a list of "8 Awesomely Stupid Movie Fight Scenes", praising the film for its nonsensical fight scenes.

In popular culture
An episode of the popular podcast How Did This Get Made? released on June 23, 2017, features Ninja Terminator. They ridiculed several aspects of the film, such as the protagonist's usage of a Garfield phone.

References

External links
 
 

1985 films
1985 martial arts films
American martial arts films
Ninja films
1980s English-language films
1980s American films